Arkebe Oqubay (born 1957) is an Ethiopian politician who is serving as Senior Minister and Special Adviser to the Prime Minister of Ethiopia. He is a Tigrayan descent.

Background
Arkebe is a member of the Tigray People's Liberation Front.
He has been at the centre of policymaking and government leadership for over thirty years. Oqubay has been a member of the core leadership of Tigrayan People's Liberation Front (TPLF) and Ethiopian People's Revolutionary Democratic Front (EPRDF), the movement that spearheaded the seventeen-year popular liberation struggle. During the liberation movement, Oqubay was a member of the executive council responsible for socio-economic affairs of the liberation army and liberated areas. 
He is strongly backed by Ethiopian PM Abiy Ahmed.

See also
Timeline of Addis Ababa, 2000s
World Policy Conference TV, 21 November 2015

References

External links
Arkebe named African Mayor of 2005
Arkebe Oquay, in his own words, at www.worldmayor.com

Living people
Mayors of Addis Ababa
1958 births
Alumni of the University of London
University of Amsterdam alumni
Alumni of the Open University
Ethiopian People's Revolutionary Democratic Front politicians
Tigray People's Liberation Front politicians
21st-century Ethiopian politicians